La Cañada Observatory, is an astronomical observatory in Ávila, Spain privately owned by Juan Lacruz, the main activity is to monitor near-Earth objects other asteroids and comets.

The observatory joined the International Astronomical Union sending the first astrometric observations in the summer of 2002. The Minor Planet Center assigned the observatory code J87: La Cañada.

Instrumental :

Telescope 0.41m F10 Ritchey-Chrétien + CCD

Gallery

External links 
 Official site
 Weather station site
  Asteroid discoveries

Blogs 
 Astronomy
 Weather and Nature
 Meteors and meteorites

La Canada
Buildings and structures in Castile and León
Minor-planet discovering observatories